Beyvafaa is a 1993 Maldivian drama film directed by Ibrahim Rasheed. Produced by Hussain Rasheed under Farivaa Films, the film stars Hussain Ali, Reeko Moosa Manik and Waleedha Waleed in pivotal roles.

Premise
Sharumeela (Waleedha Waleed), a blind orphan, intolerant of her tenants, moves out of the house she resides in. Mohamed meets Sharumeela and sympathizes for her disability and takes care of her where he later confesses his love for her. Mohamed shares his marriage plan to his father (Chilhiya Moosa Manik) who disowns him when he refuses to comply with his father's demands. Sharumeela and Mohamed marry and consult a doctor visiting from Japan. After a successful operation, Sharumeela gains her eyesight. Meanwhile, Mohamed's brother Suheil, who is married to Kaiydha (Sithi Fulhu) starts a romantic affair with an elder married-woman (Haajara Abdul Kareem).

Cast 
 Hussain Ali
 Reeko Moosa Manik as Manik/Solih
 Waleedha Waleed as Sharumeela
 Ahmed Riyaz
 Shadhiya as Shadhiya
 Abdulla Rasheed
 Ahmed Saleem
 Haajara Abdul Kareem
 Ahmed Suheil
 Sithi Fulhu as Kaiydha
 Chilhiya Moosa Manik as Mohamed's father

Soundtrack

Accolades

References

1993 films
1993 drama films
Maldivian drama films
Films directed by Ibrahim Rasheed
Dhivehi-language films